Aposiopesis (Classical Greek: ἀποσιώπησις, "becoming silent") is a figure of speech wherein a sentence is deliberately broken off and left unfinished, the ending to be supplied by the imagination, giving an impression of unwillingness or inability to continue. An example would be the threat "Get out, or else—!"  This device often portrays its users as overcome with passion (fear, anger, excitement) or modesty. To mark the occurrence of aposiopesis with punctuation, an em-rule (—) or an ellipsis (…) may be used.

Examples
 One classical example of aposiopesis in Virgil occurs in Aeneid 1.135. Neptune, the Roman god of the Sea, is angry with the winds, whom Juno released to start a storm and harass the Trojan hero and protagonist Aeneas. Neptune berates the winds for causing a storm without his approval, but breaks himself off mid-threat:

Another example in Virgil occurs in the Aeneid 2.100. Sinon, the Greek who is posing as a defector to deceive the Trojans into accepting the Trojan Horse within their city wall, tells about how Ulixes lied to spur on the war.

For an example from classical Latin theater, this occurs multiple times in one speech in Terence's Adelphoe, lines 159-140. In the play, Demea has two sons. He has given one to his brother Micio to raise. In the following scene, Demea has worked himself up in anger over his brother's laxer parenting style. The following speech provides multiple examples of aposiopesis:

 A biblical example is found in Psalm 27, verse 13. It says: "Unless I had believed I would see the goodness of the Lord in the land of the living …" The implication is that the author does not know what he would have done.

 King Lear, overcome by anger at his daughters, says:
No, you unnatural hags,
I will have such revenges on you both,
That all the world shall— I will do such things,—
What they are, yet I know not:  but they shall be
The terrors of the earth. (Shakespeare, King Lear, II.iv)

 Aposiopesis also occurs at the agitated climax of Mercutio's "Queen Mab" speech, resulting in a calming intervention by Romeo:
<poem>
Mercutio. This is the hag, when maids lie on their backs,
              That presses them and learns them first to bear,
              Making them women of good carriage:
              This is she—
Romeo.    Peace, peace, Mercutio, peace!  
              Thou talk'st of nothing. (Shakespeare, Romeo and Juliet, I.iv)</poem>

 Dante Alighieri used an Aposiopesis in his Divine Comedy, Hell IX, 7-9 (citation from the translation by Henry Wadsworth Longfellow) (Virgil speaks to himself):
“Still it behoveth us to win the fight,”
Began he; “else . . . Such offered us herself . . .
O how I long that some one here arrive!”

Grammatical definition
In syntax, an aposiopesis arises when the "if" clause (protasis) of a condition is stated without an ensuing "then" clause, or apodosis. Because an aposiopesis implies the trailing off of thought, it is never directly followed by a period, which would effectively result in four consecutive dots.

See also

 Anacoluthon
 Anapodoton
 Prosiopesis
 Quos ego
Figure of speech
Non sequitur (literary device)

Notes

References

Figures of speech
Rhetoric